John F. Black (born 1952) is an American politician, serving as a member of the Missouri House of Representatives since 2019. His first two elections were from district 137, but after redistricting of 2022, he was reelected from district 129. He is a member of the Republican party.

Electoral History

State Representative

References

Living people
1952 births
Republican Party members of the Missouri House of Representatives
21st-century American politicians